The men's 100 metre backstroke event at the 2000 Summer Olympics took place on 17–18 September at the Sydney International Aquatic Centre in Sydney, Australia.

Lenny Krayzelburg, a Ukrainian-born American whose swimming career began in the old Soviet system, shattered a new Olympic record to claim a gold medal in the event, slashing 0.14 seconds off an eight-year-old standard set by Jeff Rouse in Barcelona. He seized the lead on the first length, and held off a challenge from Australia's overwhelming favorite Matt Welsh down the final lap to touch the wall first in 53.72. Delighted by the frenzied home crowd, Welsh took home with a silver medal in an Oceanian record of 54.07. Meanwhile, Germany's Stev Theloke stormed home from behind to wrest a bronze in 54.82, edging out another Aussie Josh Watson (55.01) by almost two-tenths of a second (0.20).

Poland's Bartosz Kizierowski finished fifth with a time of 55.04, and was followed in the sixth spot by U.S. swimmer Neil Walker in 55.14. Theloke's teammate Steffen Driesen (55.27) and Israel's Eithan Urbach (55.74) closed out the field.

Records
Prior to this competition, the existing world and Olympic records were as follows.

The following new world and Olympic records were set during this competition.

Results

Heats

Semifinals

Semifinal 1

Semifinal 2

Final

References

External links
Official Olympic Report

B
Men's events at the 2000 Summer Olympics